Stella Ashcroft (born 27 July 2002) is an artistic gymnast from New Zealand, specialising in the vault, beam and floor events. In 2018, she competed at the Commonwealth Games on the Gold Coast, Australia.

Ashcroft is from Christchurch, New Zealand. In 2016, she won a bronze medal at the Pacific Rim Championships. In 2017, she won gold, silver and bronze medals at the Junior Commonwealth Gymnastics Championships in Namibia.

In 2018, Ashcroft received a New Zealand Racing Board Scholarship. In 2018 she competed at the gymnastics World Cup in Melbourne, Australia, her first event as a senior athlete.

References

Living people
2002 births
Sportspeople from Christchurch
New Zealand female artistic gymnasts
Gymnasts at the 2018 Commonwealth Games
Commonwealth Games competitors for New Zealand